Jeff Schwartz (born February 24, 1964) is President and Founder of Excel Sports Management, a full-service sports management and marketing agency. He represents a number of NBA superstars, including Kemba Walker, Kevin Love, Andre Drummond, Nikola Jokic, LaMarcus Aldridge, Brandon Ingram, Paul Pierce and Jason Kidd, among others.

Background 
Schwartz grew up in New Haven, Connecticut.  He earned his B.A. at Miami University in Oxford, Ohio and Juris Doctor at Temple University Law School in Philadelphia. In 1990, Schwartz had a judicial clerkship for a federal bankruptcy judge in Los Angeles. He then joined Connecticut law firm Cummings & Lockwood as an associate in the commercial litigation department.

Career as sports agent 
Schwartz began his sports management career in 1992 at International Management Group (IMG) managing the careers of tennis greats Pete Sampras, Marcelo Rios and Martina Hingis. After seven years at IMG, he joined Artists Management Group (AMG) and built the athlete division into a multi-sport company representing top athletes in tennis, basketball, golf, hockey and baseball. In 2000, Schwartz was named the 15th Most Influential Person in Tennis by Tennis Magazine.

Excel Sports Management 
Schwartz established Excel Sports Management in 2002 as a full-service management and marketing business. To date, he has negotiated more than $3 billion in contracts and is consistently ranked as the top basketball agent in terms of contract revenue.

Schwartz has forged millions of dollars in endorsement deals, including those with Nike, Under Armour, Adidas, 361°, Spalding, AT&T, KIA and Red Bull.

Excel growth 
In 2011, Schwartz expanded Excel into a multi-sport agency with the addition of baseball and golf agents, Casey Close and Mark Steinberg. Close brought several clients to Excel, including Derek Jeter, Ryan Howard and Derrek Lee. Steinberg brought long-time client Tiger Woods to the agency.  Excel is a perennial finalist for   Sports Business Journal's Best in Talent Management Award and has won twice.  The agency has also appeared in the top three of Forbes Most Powerful Sports Agencies the last four years.

Personal life 
Schwartz serves on the Miami University Corporate Athletic Board.

He resides in Miami, FL, with his wife and their daughters.

References

External links
 http://www.excelsm.com/
 http://www.sportsbusinessdaily.com/Journal/Issues/2011/04/11/Labor-and-Agents/Close-joins-Schwartz.aspx
 
 https://www.businessinsider.com/mark-steinberg-joins-jeff-schwartz-casey-close-at-excel-sports-management-2011-7
 https://www.espn.com/new-york/nba/news/story?id=6733383
 https://nba.nbcsports.com/2011/07/03/deron-williams-signs-with-new-agent-jeff-schwartz/
 http://www.nhregister.com/articles/2010/08/20/sports/doc4c6def58a4898858336281.txt
 http://hoopshype.com/agents/jeff_schwartz.htm
 http://www.law.harvard.edu/news/2012/02/03_representing-the-professional-athlete-2012.html
 https://www.businessinsider.com/kemba-walker-signs-with-excel-sports-for-representation-2011-4
 http://www.hoopsworld.com/the-2010-most-influential-in-basketball
 http://www.draftexpress.com/agents/Jeff-Schwartz-53/
 http://hoopshype.com/agents.htm
 http://www.businessinsider.com/on-to-the-next-one-gary-woodland-2012-1

1964 births
Living people
American sports agents
Businesspeople from New Haven, Connecticut